Professor Andrew William Goudie CB (born 3 March 1955) is a Visiting Professor at the University of Strathclyde.

Educated at Queens' College, Cambridge, he joined the Scottish Office in 1990.

He was appointed Companion of the Order of the Bath (CB) in the 2011 New Year Honours.

He published the book "Scotland's Future: The Economics of Constitutional Change".

Positions
 Research Fellow, Queens' College, Cambridge (1981–83)
 Director of Cambridge Econometrics
 Economist at the World Bank
 Principal Economist at the Organisation for Economic Co-operation and Development (1995)
 Chief Economist for the Overseas Development Administration/Department for International Development (1996)
 Director General Economy and Chief Economic Adviser to the Scottish Government (1999)
 Visiting Professor at The University of Strathclyde (2011)

References

Scottish economists
Scottish civil servants
1955 births
Place of birth missing (living people)
Alumni of Queens' College, Cambridge
Civil servants in the Scottish Government
Living people
Companions of the Order of the Bath
Fellows of Queens' College, Cambridge